Patrizia Miserini (born 11 February 1958) is an Italian former breaststroke swimmer who competed in the 1972 Summer Olympics.

References

1958 births
Living people
Italian female breaststroke swimmers
Olympic swimmers of Italy
Swimmers at the 1972 Summer Olympics
Mediterranean Games gold medalists for Italy
Mediterranean Games medalists in swimming
Swimmers at the 1971 Mediterranean Games
20th-century Italian women